In enzymology, a thioethanolamine S-acetyltransferase is an enzyme that catalyzes the chemical reaction

acetyl-CoA + 2-aminoethanethiol  CoA + S-(2-aminoethyl)thioacetate

Thus, the two substrates of this enzyme are acetyl-CoA and 2-aminoethanethiol, whereas its two products are CoA and S-(2-aminoethyl)thioacetate.

This enzyme belongs to the family of transferases, specifically those acyltransferases transferring groups other than aminoacyl groups.  The systematic name of this enzyme class is acetyl-CoA:2-aminoethanethiol S-acetyltransferase. Other names in common use include thioltransacetylase B, thioethanolamine acetyltransferase, and acetyl-CoA:thioethanolamine S-acetyltransferase.

References

 
 McElroy, W.D. and Glass, B. (Eds.), A Symposium on the Mechanism of Enzyme Action, Johns Hopkins Press, Baltimore, 1954, p. 545-580.

EC 2.3.1
Enzymes of unknown structure